Route 50 may refer to:
 U.S. Route 50 transcontinental, US highway
 Route 50 (MTA Maryland), a bus route in Baltimore, Maryland
 London Buses route 50
 List of highways numbered 50

See also
 Route Fifty

50